The 1990 United States House of Representatives elections in Montana were held on November 6, 1990 to elect the two U.S. representatives to represent the state of Montana in the 102nd Congress. The elections coincided with other elections to the House of Representatives, elections to the U.S. Senate, and various other state and local elections.

This was the last election in which Montana had two congressional districts until the 2022 elections, where it regained its second district after the 2020 census.

Overview

District 1

District 2

References 

1990
Montana
United States House of Representatives